Beani Bazar Government College is a college in Beanibazar Upazila, Bangladesh.

References

Education in Sylhet District
Beanibazar Upazila